Obeid Al-Dosari (born 2 October 1975) is retired a Saudi Arabian football player who played most of his career for Al Wahda and Al Ahli.

He played for the Saudi Arabia national football team and was a participant at the 1998 FIFA World Cup and at the 2002 FIFA World Cup. Al-Dosari also played at the 1996 Summer Olympics.

International career

International goals
Scores and results list saudi Arabia's goal tally first.

References

External links

1975 births
Saudi Arabian footballers
Saudi Arabia international footballers
1995 King Fahd Cup players
1997 FIFA Confederations Cup players
1998 FIFA World Cup players
2002 FIFA World Cup players
2000 AFC Asian Cup players
Living people
Footballers at the 1996 Summer Olympics
Olympic footballers of Saudi Arabia
Al-Ahli Saudi FC players
Al-Wehda Club (Mecca) players
Damac FC players
Association football forwards
Saudi First Division League players
Saudi Professional League players
Footballers at the 1994 Asian Games
Asian Games competitors for Saudi Arabia